The 2019 Shengxin IWF World Cup in weightlifting was held in Tianjin, China from 10 to 13 December 2019. It was also a qualification event for the 2020 Summer Olympics in Tokyo.

Shi Zhiyong set the new men's -73kg clean and jerk world record at 198kg. Deng Wei set the new women's -64kg snatch world record at 117kg. Eileen Cikamatana set two new women's -81kg junior world records in the clean and jerk (150kg) and the total (260kg).

Medal overview

Men

Women

References 

IWF World Cup
2019 in weightlifting
IWF World Cup
International weightlifting competitions hosted by China
IWF World Cup
Weightlifting at the 2020 Summer Olympics
Sports competitions in Tianjin